The 13th Legislative Assembly of Quebec was the provincial legislature in Quebec, Canada that existed from May 15, 1912, to May 22, 1916. The Quebec Liberal Party led by Lomer Gouin was the governing party.

Seats per political party

 After the 1912 elections

Member list

This was the list of members of the Legislative Assembly of Quebec that were elected in the 1912 election:

Other elected MLAs

 Joseph-Léonide Perron, Quebec Liberal Party, Verchères, October 16, 1912 
 Joseph-Émery Phaneuf, Quebec Liberal Party, Bagot, January 16, 1913 
 Alfred-Joseph Bissonnett, Quebec Liberal Party, Stanstead, January 16, 1913 
 Lucien Cannon, Quebec Liberal Party, Dorchester, June 2, 1913 
 Arthur Trahan, Quebec Liberal Party, Nicolet, June 2, 1913 
 Andrew Philps, Quebec Liberal Party, Huntingdon, November 10, 1913 
 Marcellin Robert, Quebec Liberal Party, St. Jean, November 10, 1913 
 Joseph-Fabien Bugeaud, Quebec Liberal Party, Bonaventure, May 7, 1914 
 Walter George Mitchell, Quebec Liberal Party, Richmond, November 21, 1914

Cabinet Ministers

 Prime Minister and Executive Council President: Lomer Gouin
 Agriculture: Joseph-Édouard Caron
 Colonisation, Mines and Fishing: Charles Devlin Ramsey (1912-1914), Honoré Mercier Jr. (1914-1916)
 Public Works and Labor: Louis-Alexandre Taschereau 
 Lands and Forests: Jules Allard 
 Roads: Joseph-Édouard Caron (1912-1914), Joseph-Adolphe Tessier (1914-1916)
 Attorney General:Lomer Gouin
 Provincial secretary: Louis-Jérémie Décarie 
 Treasurer: Peter Samuel George MacKenzie (1912-1914), Walter Georges Mitchell (1914-1916)

References
 1912 election results
 List of historical Cabinet Ministers

13